"Wet the Bed" is a song by American R&B recording artist Chris Brown featuring American rapper Ludacris, from his fourth studio album F.A.M.E. (2011). It was written by Brown, Kevin McCall, Sevyn Streeter, and Christopher Bridges, and produced by Bigg D. Lyrically, the song sees Brown and Ludacris exploring ways to leave a woman satisfied. "Wet the Bed" received mixed reviews from most music critics, who were ambivalent towards its lyrics. It was released as a single and has appeared on the US Hot R&B/Hip-Hop Songs chart at number twenty-five. The song has been performed live at the album's listening party, as well as on Brown's F.A.M.E. Tour.

Background and composition 
"Wet the Bed" was written by Brown, Kevin McCall, Sevyn Streeter and Christopher Bridges, while the production was handled by Bigg D and Steven "Q-Beatz" Kubie aka "The Kid" at South Beach Studios, Miami with engineers Eric Manco and Ryan Coplan. It was recorded and mixed by Brian Springer at The Record Plant—a studio in Los Angeles, California. "Wet the Bed" is a slow-tempo R&B song. The song begins with keys laced over a beat of dripping sound effects. It also makes use of acoustic guitar. According to Brad Wete from Entertainment Weekly, the song "rival[s] the bump-'n'-grind heights of '90s Casanova crew Jodeci." Ludacris opens the song proclaiming: "Hear the sound of your body drip, drip, drip / As I kiss both sexy lip, lip, lips." Using "blatant sexual metaphors", Brown then sings: "I ain't afraid to drown, if that means I deep up in your ocean yeah / Girl I'll drink you down, sipping on your body all night."

Live performances 
Brown and Ludacris performed the song live for the first time at a listening party for Brown's album F.A.M.E on March 18, 2011. For the performance, Brown wore navy pants and a blue hoodie reading "F.A.M.E.", while Ludacris wore sunglasses, a black shirt and jacket, and grey pants. In April 2011, Brown embarked on his F.A.M.E. Tour in Australia, where he performed "Wet the Bed" as part of the concert's setlist.

Critical reception 
Steve Jones from USA Today called the song "salacious" and wrote that Brown is "taking it to the next phase." Joanne Dorken from MTV UK felt "rather apprehensive" of the song, and noted it "sees Breezy exploring ways to er, leave a woman satisfied." Nick Levine from BBC Music wrote that "Brown's identity crisis is betrayed most blatantly by the sequencing of "Wet the Bed."" Hannah Ash from The Harber Herald criticized the song's lyrics for being "kind of a gross-out and really don't need to be paid attention to", but praised Brown's "beautiful vocals, so that makes up for it." Eric Henderson from Slant Magazine criticized the song's opening verse, as well as Ludarcris' verse, "Women call me the Super Soaker and Ima soak your bed to death", as "some new form of jizz torture." Calling the song an "over-the-top hyper-sexual", Chad Grischow from IGN wrote that it is the "kind of excessively crude sludge that would have made 12 Play era R. Kelly blush." Cristin Maher from PopCrush wrote that "it is almost shocking to hear the unbelievably lustful lyrics projecting from Brown as he sings the song".

Chart performance
In the issue dated July 30, 2011, "Wet the Bed" debuted at number 89 on the US Hot R&B/Hip-Hop Songs chart, and peaked at number nine in the issue dated October 8, 2011. On the US Billboard Hot 100 chart, the song debuted at number 96  in the issue dated September 24, 2011 and peaked at number 77.

Credits and personnel 
Credits adapted from the liner notes for F.A.M.E..

Derrick "Bigg D" Baker – songwriter, guitar, producer
Steven "Q-Beatz" Kubie aka "The Kid" – programming, keys, engineering, songwriter
Joseph Bereal – songwriter
Chris Brown – songwriter, lead vocals
Iain Findlay – assistant mixer
David Anderson – additional keyboards
Eric Manco – engineer
Ryan Coplan – assistant engineer

Ludacris – songwriter, featured vocals
Kevin McCall – songwriter
Andre Merritt – songwriter
Brian Springer – recorder, mixer
Amber Streeter – songwriter, featured vocals

Charts

Weekly charts

Year-end charts

Certifications

Radio add dates

References

2011 singles
Chris Brown songs
Ludacris songs
Songs written by Andre Merritt
Songs written by Chris Brown
Songs written by Ludacris
Songs written by Sevyn Streeter
2011 songs
Songs written by Kevin McCall
Songs written by Lonny Bereal
Songs written by Bigg D